Greater Bangalore, or Greater Bengaluru following the renaming of the city in 2014, is the core metropolitan area of Bangalore and its neighbouring regions. It occupies an area of 741 sq. km.

History
In January 2007, the Karnataka Government issued a notification to merge 100 wards of the erstwhile Bangalore Mahanagara Palike with seven City Municipal Councils (CMC)s, one Town Municipal Council (TMC) and 111 villages around the city to form a single administrative area. The process was completed in April 2007.

Geography
The following are the Corporations and Municipal council areas were merged to form Greater Bangalore:
 Bangalore City Corporation
 Bommanahalli City Municipal Council
 Mahadevapura City Municipal Council
 Krishnarajapura City Municipal Council
 Rajarajeshwari Nagar City Municipal Council
 Dasarahalli City Municipal Council
 Byatarayanapura City Municipal Council
 Yelahanka City Municipal Council
 Kengeri Town Municipal Council
 Electronics City Notified Area
 In addition, 111 villages adjacent to Bangalore City Corporation and above mentioned City Municipal Councils and Town Municipal Council.

External links
 BBMP Website in English
 Website of BBMP Wards
 BBMP Citizen Service Centers

See also
 Bruhat Bangalore Mahanagara Palike

References

Economy of Bangalore